Pang Puai railway station is a railway station located in Na Sak Subdistrict, Mae Mo District, Lampang. It is located 591.079 km from Bangkok railway station and is a class 3 railway station. It is on the Northern Line of the State Railway of Thailand.

Train services 
 Local 407/408 Nakhon Sawan-Chiang Mai-Nakhon Sawan

1989 rail disaster 
On 23 May 1989, a rail accident occurred at about 20:30 as the then rapid no. 38 (Chiang Mai-Bangkok) collided into the face of a mountain and derailed. The accident occurred between Pang Puai and Pha Khan railway stations. The train operator was instantly killed and mechanic and train conductor received minor injuries. All 8 carriages fell into the adjacent valley, causing 8 deaths, 32 serious injuries and 107 minor injuries. After inspection, the cause was identified as due to a braking system failure. The system was fixed at Nakhon Lampang station, but failed again near Mae Mo station. At the site of the accident, it was reported the speed was at 75 km/h when the speed limit was 45 km/h and the accident occurred following the application of an emergency brake.

References 
 Ichirō, Kakizaki (2010). Ōkoku no tetsuro: tai tetsudō no rekishi. Kyōto: Kyōtodaigakugakujutsushuppankai. 
 Otohiro, Watanabe (2013). Tai kokutetsu yonsenkiro no tabi: shasō fūkei kanzen kiroku. Tōkyō: Bungeisha. 
 กระทู้ถามที่ ๑๓๖ ร. เรื่อง รถไฟตกราง ราชกิจจานุเบกษา เล่ม 106 ตอนพิเศษที่ 166 ง วันที่ 1 ตุลาคม 2532

Railway stations in Thailand